Michelle Courtens (born 3 August 1981), performing as Michelle, is a Dutch singer, who is known from her participation in the Eurovision Song Contest 2001.

She was born in Venray, The Netherlands. On 2 March 2001, Michelle competed in the final of the Dutch National Song Contest, with the alternative pop song "Out on My Own". She won the final with a score of 84, 30 points more than the contestant finishing second. Both the audience and the professional jury awarded her the most points, respectively 50 and 34. This meant she could go to the Eurovision Song Contest 2001 in Copenhagen, Denmark. In Copenhagen, she only achieved 18th place with 16 points. In 2002, she released the single "Coming Up Roses". Currently, she is working as a singing teacher.

References

1981 births
Living people
Eurovision Song Contest entrants for the Netherlands
Eurovision Song Contest entrants of 2001
Dutch LGBT singers
Dutch lesbian musicians
Lesbian singers
People from Venray
English-language singers from the Netherlands
21st-century Dutch women singers
Nationaal Songfestival contestants
Spanish-language singers of the Netherlands